The Westkreis-Liga  (English: Western district league) was the highest association football league in the Bavarian region of Palatinate, the northern parts of the Grand Duchy of Baden, the southern parts of the Prussian Rhine Province and parts of Lorraine from 1908 to 1918. The league was disbanded with the introduction of the Kreisliga Pfalz, Kreisliga Saar and Kreisliga Hessen in 1919.

History
The league was formed in a move to improve the organisation of football in Southern Germany in the early 1900s. Within the structure of the Southern German football championship, four regional leagues were gradually established from 1908, these being:
 Ostkreis-Liga, covering Bavaria
 Nordkreis-Liga, covering Hesse
 Südkreis-Liga, covering Württemberg, Baden and Alsace
 Westkreis-Liga, covering the Palatinate, Lorraine and the southern Rhine Province

Until then, regional leagues had existed which send their champions to the Kreis finals and, from there, the winners went on to the Southern and German championships.

In 1908, the Westkreis-Liga was established, consisting of seven clubs from the Palatinate, playing a home-and-away season, these clubs being:
 FC 1900 Kaiserlautern
 FC Pfalz Ludwigshafen
 Palatia Kaiserslautern
 Ludwigshafener FG 03
 Germania Ludwigshafen
 Revida Ludwigshafen
 Bavaria Kaiserslautern

FC 1900 Kaiserlautern, the first league champion, qualified thereby for the Southern German championship, where it did not impress, finishing last with only one point out of six games.

In its second year, the league expanded to nine clubs, now spanning a wider area and including clubs from Mannheim and Darmstadt. In 1909-10, the league played in an unchanged format, but was reduced to eight clubs for the next season, a format it maintained until 1914.

In the last pre-First World War season, 1913–14, with the SpVgg Metz, a club from Lorraine joined the league.

The war starting in August 1914 meant an end to the league, no championship was played in 1914-15 at all. In the following three seasons, regional leagues operated, like before 1908. A Westkreis championship as well as a Southern German one was played, but no national title games were held.

With the end of the war in November 1918, football came to a halt once more. Lorraine ceased to be a part of Germany and the German football league system, being awarded to France. New leagues started to operate from 1919 and in the parts of the Westkreis still with Germany, the Kreisliga Pfalz, Kreisliga Saar and Kreisliga Hessen were formed.

National success
The Westkreis was one of the weaker regions as football was concerned in this era, taking out no Southern German championships at the time and never qualifying for the German championship.

Southern German championship
Qualified teams and their success:
 1909: FC 1900 Kaiserlautern, 4th
 1910: Mannheimer FG Union 97, 3rd
 1911: Mannheimer FG Union 97, 3rd
 1912: FC Phönix Mannheim, Runners-up
 1913: VfR Mannheim, 3rd
 1914: VfR Mannheim, 4th
 1916: FC Pfalz Ludwigshafen, Runners-up
 1917: FC Pfalz Ludwigshafen, 4th
 1918: FC Phönix Mannheim, Runners-up

German championship
None qualified.

Winners and runners-up of the Westkreis-Liga and championship

Placings in the Westkreis-Liga  1908-14

 1 In 1909, FC 1900 merged with FC Palatia and FC Bavaria to form FV Kaiserslautern. In 1929, this club merged with SV Phönix to form 1. FC Kaiserslautern.
 2 In 1911, FG Union 97 merged with FC Viktoria 97 and FG 1896  to form VfR Mannheim.
 3 SpVgg Metz (sometimes SV Metz) players formed Cercle Athlétique Messin in 1919, which evolved to become FC Metz in 1932.

References

Sources
 Fussball-Jahrbuch Deutschland  (8 vol.), Tables and results of the German tier-one leagues 1919-33, publisher: DSFS
 Kicker Almanach,  The yearbook on German football from Bundesliga to Oberliga, since 1937, published by the Kicker Sports Magazine
 Süddeutschlands Fussballgeschichte in Tabellenform 1897-1988  History of Southern German football in tables, publisher & author: Ludolf Hyll

External links
 The Gauligas Das Deutsche Fussball Archiv 
 German league tables 1892–1933 Hirschi's Fussball seiten 
 Germany – Championships 1902–1945 at RSSSF.com

1
1908 establishments in Germany
1918 disestablishments in Germany
Football competitions in Baden-Württemberg
Football competitions in Hesse
Football competitions in Rhineland-Palatinate
Football competitions in Saarland
20th century in Baden-Württemberg
20th century in Hesse
20th century in Rhineland-Palatinate
Southern German football championship
Football competitions in Alsace-Lorraine
Sports leagues established in 1908
Ger